The Animal Project is a 2013 Canadian drama film written and directed by Ingrid Veninger and starring Aaron Poole, Hannah Cheesman, and Emmanuel Kabongo. It debuted at the Contemporary World Cinema section at the 2013 Toronto International Film Festival.

Cast
 Aaron Poole as Leo
 Hannah Cheesman as Alice
 Jessica Greco as Pippa
 Emmanuel Kabongo as Ray
 Joey Klein as Saul
 Sarena Parmar as Mira
 Johnathan Sousa as Jason
 Jacob Switzer as Sam
 Joanne Vannicola as Morag
 Lindsay Owen Pierre as Matteo

Production 
Music for the film is by Nick Storring, creating his first feature film score. Due to the film's "naturalistic tone", he notes there's little music. Storring wrote on his blog that Veninger and he "tried numerous types of things with different scenes, and in some of those cases the decision was ultimately no music at all." Friendly Rich & The Lollipop People appear in the film with "Sei Spento il Sole".

Reception
In a story about Canadian films at TIFF in 2013 when the film premiered, Maclean's dubbed Veninger "Toronto’s reigning queen of DIY cinema".

Release
The film premiered at the Contemporary World Cinema section at the 2013 Toronto International Film Festival.

The film has also screened at the St. John's International Women's Film Festival, with a one-hour "making of" talkback section. In November, it will screen at the Denver Film Festival.

Critical reception

NOW Magazine commented that "It may not be the sort of hyper-personal near-meta-fiction Veninger defined her career with, but The Animal Project seems to similarly prod the relationship between interiority and outside world." In a review, the magazine gave it their highest rating, "NNNN", declaring it a transitional project for the director, who "upped her game without abandoning any of her characteristic whimsy." They note the film has a narrative story unlike her previous films, and a "more formal visual style".

Highlighting actor Aaron Poole in an article, Torontoist suggested that the film was "heavy with emotional baggage but imbued with a lightness that comes from being partially improvised," suggesting it might "demonstrate a different side of Poole." Ilse de Mucha Herrera for The Arts Scene website suggested that the film is "nothing short of delightful", a "refreshing" film with "a script full of passion with relatable characters and creative sequences," rating it 4/5.

Isabel Cupryn of Canadian Film Review commented: "With pure honesty and unwavering compassion for its characters, it's hard not to fall in love with this quiet, thoughtful film. The Animal Project is like its creator Ingrid Veninger — genuine and true to its heart."

Weekly newspaper The Grid suggested that the use of costumes is "less striking than it's intended to be", but "the good moments... linger vividly in the rearview mirror," offering it 7/10.

Pop culture website Dork Shelf suggested "the scattered moments of human observation that make up the film are almost always careful and poignant," but the overall film premise and characters' "revelatory experiences" "never [feel] genuine." Canadian entertainment website Scene Creek also gave a less than enthused review, 2 out of 5 stars. Critic Danielle La Valle praised the father and son conflict, suggesting it should have been the film's focus, praising Jacob Switzer's "great skill and understatement" in the role. The review cites the dysfunction of Leo needing to disguise himself and offer free hugs at his son's high school, in order to feel comfortable hugging him. She suggests that the concept of obliterating comfort zones with the costumes is incorrect, as the outfits would add a layer of comfort through anonymity.

Toronto Star connected the film with six other Canadian films screening at the festival, all with themes of identity. Critic Linda Barnard deemed it 3/4 stars.

Yahoo! TIFF Blog writer Will Perkins named it among the top five Canadian films screening at the festival.

References

External links
 
 
 

2013 films
2013 drama films
Canadian drama films
English-language Canadian films
Films directed by Ingrid Veninger
2010s English-language films
2010s Canadian films